Mobile is a local service district and designated place in the Canadian province of Newfoundland and Labrador on the Avalon Peninsula.

Geography 
Mobile is in Newfoundland within Subdivision U of Division No. 1. It has a beach and is forested.

Demographics 

Government 
Mobile is a local service district (LSD) that is governed by a committee responsible for the provision of certain services to the community. The chair of the LSD committee is Julie White.

See also 
List of communities in Newfoundland and Labrador
List of designated places in Newfoundland and Labrador
List of local service districts in Newfoundland and Labrador

References

External links 
 Mobile site
 https://www.livinginmobile.org/

Designated places in Newfoundland and Labrador
Local service districts in Newfoundland and Labrador